The Public Service Commission of Wisconsin is an independent regulatory agency responsible for regulating public utilities in the energy, telecommunications, gas and water companies located in U.S. state of Wisconsin. As of 2021, the agency regulated more than 1,100 electric, natural gas, telephone, water, and water/sewer utilities.

The commission consists of three full-time commissioners that are appointed by the governor and confirmed by the Wisconsin State Senate in staggered six-year terms. The current commissioners are Tyler Huebner, Ellen Nowak, and Rebecca Cameron Valcq.

Mr. Huebner was appointed to the Commission by Governor Tony Evers in March 2020 to fill out the term of former Commissioner Michael Huebsch, then re-appointed to a full term on March 2, 2021. Ms. Nowak was appointed to the Commission in July 2011 by Governor Scott Walker and reconfirmed for a full term on March 1, 2013. After leaving the Commission to serve as Secretary of the Department of Administration, she was appointed in January 2019 for a third time by Walker to complete the term of former Commissioner Lon Roberts. Ms. Nowak's term will expire in 2023. Ms. Cameron Valcq was appointed by Governor Evers for a six-year term beginning in January 2019. Governor Evers also appointed her as Commission Chairperson for a two-year term effective March 2, 2019.

The commissioners are assisted by a staff of auditors, accountants, engineers, rate analysts, attorneys, planners, research analysts, economists, consumer specialists, and other support personnel. The staff is divided into several divisions: Division of Business Operations and Office Management; Division of Digital Access, Consumer and Environmental Affairs; Division of Energy Regulation and Analysis; Division of Water Utility Regulation and Analysis; and the Office of General Counsel.

In Wisconsin, most activities of the 28 electric cooperatives are not under the jurisdiction of the PSC.

Notable rate cases
In 2014, the Public Service Commission came under atypical scrutiny for three utility rate cases. The primary issue in the three cases was the matter of distributed generation. The cases drew widespread opposition from ratepayers regarding increases in the fixed fees for all customers.

The largest utility of the three, We Energies, also proposed increasing fees on customers who generate their own power, like those with rooftop solar. The case generated thousands of public comments opposing the changes. Around 500 ratepayers came out to protest the rate case at the public hearing in October.

The Public Service Commission’s staff analyst on these cases, Corey Singletary, testified that We Energies had not provided enough evidence to justify the changes they requested. Through discovery, We Energies was forced to reveal that it had commissioned and paid for a study stating that net metering customers provided a net benefit to all ratepayers, contradicting their claims in the rate case.

Despite the lack of evidence to support the changes, the Commission voted to approve the requested increase to the fixed charges both for all customers and the additional charge on self-generators. Chairman Phil Montgomery and Commissioner Ellen Nowak supported the change, while Commissioner Eric Callisto dissented.

Controversy
Public Service Commissioners are prohibited by Wisconsin statute from communicating with parties with a substantial interest in the outcome of a pending case. There have been two major scandals involving violations of this law, both involving We Energies.

1997
During a pending utility merger between Wisconsin Energy Corp. and Northern States Power, the Commission defended themselves against allegations of improper communication between one of the Commissioners and utility executives regarding the merger.

2014
During the pending We Energies rate case, Commissioner Ellen Nowak appeared to violate both the ex parte rules and the law requiring Commissioners to remain impartial. In both March and June, Commissioner Nowak appeared on panels for conferences hosted by the Edison Electric Institute. In both panels, she advised her own utilities on ratemaking practices. In the June panel, titled “Utility Regulation and Success in a Low Growth Economy,” she appeared alongside We Energies CEO Gale Klappa. There was also question as to whether any other communication occurred between Commissioner Nowak and Klappa or other utility staff.

Groups and individual ratepayers called for Commissioner Nowak to recuse herself from the case due to her lack of impartiality.

See also
 Public Utilities Commission

References

External links
Wisconsin Public Service Commission Website

Wisconsin
State agencies of Wisconsin